Arild Andersen (19 February 1928 – 11 January 1997) was a Norwegian professional racing cyclist. He won the Norwegian National Road Race Championship in 1950.

References

External links

1928 births
1997 deaths
Norwegian male cyclists
Place of birth missing